Helio Alves (born 1966) is a jazz pianist and son of pianists.

He moved to Boston, Massachusetts at 18 to study at the Berklee College of Music. He remained in Boston until age 24, then moved to New York City on advice from a friend. He has collaborated for many years with Claudio Roditi, including on the Grammy nominated Brazilliance X4 (2007). He was the featured soloist on Then Again as a member of the Paul Peress Trio. He was a member of the band Circlechant led by Santi Debriano and has worked with Rosa Passos, Joyce, Duduka da Fonseca, Airto Moreira, and Maucha Adnet. In 2003 he was pianist on the Grammy-winning album of Obrigado Brasil by Yo Yo Ma, Big Band by Joe Henderson, and Brazilian Dreams by Paquito D'Rivera.

Discography

As leader
 Trios (Reservoir, 1998)
 Yatrata (Clavebop, 2003)
 Portrait in Black and White (Reservoir, 2003)
 Songs from the Last Century (Blue Toucan Music, 2005)
 It's Clear (Reservoir, 2009)
 Musica (Jazz Legacy, 2010)
 Milagre with Maucha Adnet (Zoho, 2013)

As sideman
With Santi Debriano
 1999 Circle Chant 
Artistic License (Savant, 2001)

With Duduka da Fonseca
 2002 Samba Jazz Fantasia 
 2006 Samba Jazz in Black & White
 2012 Samba Jazz - Jazz Samba

With Carol Fredett
 2009 Everything in Time
 2014 No Sad Songs for Me

With Joe Henderson
 1996 Big Band
 2004 The Other Side of Joe Henderson

With Joyce
 2007 Samba Jazz & Outras Bossas
 2010 Slow Music
 2015 Raiz

With Nilson Matta
 2000 Encontros
 2006 Walking with My Bass

With John Pizzarelli
 2015 Midnight McCartney 
 2017 Sinatra & Jobim at 50

With Claudio Roditi
 1995 Samba Manhattan Style 
 1997 Double Standards
 2009 Brazilliance X4
 2010 Simpatico

With others
 2002 Brazilian Dreams, Paquito D'Rivera
 2003 O Violeiro Mais Sertanejo Do Brasil Vol. 3, Paulinho da Viola
 2003 Obrigado Brazil, Yo-Yo Ma
 2004 Amorosa, Rosa Passos
 2004 Embrace, Dave Pietro
 2006 The Jobim Songbook, Maúcha Adnet
 2007 Vision of Love, Christine Capdeville
 2008 Forests, Brazilian Trio
 2009 Bossa Beleza, Gabriela Anders
 2009 The Time Keeper, Louis Hayes
 2012 Constelação, Brazilian Trio
 2012 Live in Berkeley, Airto Moreira, Flora Purim
 2017 Portraits of Joni, Jessica Molaskey

References 

American jazz pianists
American male pianists
People from São Paulo
Living people
1966 births
20th-century American pianists
21st-century American pianists
20th-century American male musicians
21st-century American male musicians
American male jazz musicians
Reservoir Records artists